Free the Music is the fourth and second major-label studio album by American country music artist Jerrod Niemann. It was released on October 2, 2012, via Sea Gayle Music and Arista Nashville. Niemann co-produced the album and wrote or co-wrote all twelve tracks. The album features a duet with Colbie Caillat, "All About You."

Track listing

Personnel
 Dave Brainard – upright bass, bass guitar, acoustic guitar, electric guitar, harmonica, keyboards, percussion
 Taryn Brainard – background vocals
 Colbie Caillat – background vocals on "All About You"
 Cliff Canterbury – background vocals
 Devri DePriest – French horn
 Will Doughty – piano, keyboards, Hammond B-3 organ
 Dustin Evans – pitched beer bottles
 John Christopher Hamm – trumpet
 William Elliott – trombone
 Chris Estes – reggae drums
 Rob Hatch – background vocals
 Byron House – upright bass
 Bill Huber – tuba
 Tim Lauer – accordion
 David Mahurin – drums
 J.R. McCoy – percussion, congas, finger snaps, hand claps
 Lance Miller – background vocals
 Travis Mobley – piano, Wurlitzer electric piano
 Natalie Murphy – violin
 Jerrod Niemann – acoustic guitar, lead vocals, background vocals
 Tim Teague – acoustic B-bender guitar, electric guitar
 Carl Utterstom – trombone
 Karl Wingruber – saxophone, clarinet

Chart performance

Album

Singles

References

2012 albums
Jerrod Niemann albums
Arista Records albums
Albums produced by Dave Brainard